Double Barrel is a 2017 Philippine action film co-written and directed by Toto Natividad. The film stars AJ Muhlach, Phoebe Walker and Jeric Raval.

Cast
 AJ Muhlach as Jeff
 Phoebe Walker as Martha
 Jeric Raval as Insp. Bagani
 Ali Khatibi as SPO4 Lagman
 Oliver Aquino as Pancho
 Caleb Santos as Policeman
 Carlo Lazerna as Policeman
 Ronald Moreno as Policeman
 Dindo Arroyo as Gunman
 Mon Confiado as Gunman
 Richard Manabat as Policeman
 Leon Miguel as Gunman
 Joseph Ison as Gunman
 Giovanni Baldisseri as Gunman
 Jon Romano as Drug Lord
 Lubel Fernandez as Wife of Drug Lord
 Silay Tan as Wife of Tokhang Victim
 Angel Ortiz as Son of Jeff and Martha

References

External links

2017 films
2017 action films
Filipino-language films
Philippine action films
Viva Films films
Films directed by Toto Natividad